LASCO Affiliated Companie (formerly LASCO Group of Companies) is a Jamaican holding company with operations in food products, financial services and distribution.

History
In 2004, the company started a factory in Plymouth, England to manufacture products for the West Indian community in the United Kingdom that they withdrew within two years.

After lengthy litigation, Chin's ex-wife Audrey, a chartered accountant, was awarded 50% shares in the company. The marriage ended in 1994, but the ruling by the Judicial Committee of the Privy Council was not issued until October 1st 2007.
 
In 2006, Lasco, which sells imported milk powder in Jamaica, unsuccessfully opposed the Jamaican Government's proposal to create a Dairy Development Board.'''

Until 2008 they were the Official Distributors for Johnson & Johnson products in Jamaica.

Company's structure
LASCO holds three companies:

LASCO Manufacturing, Limited 
 LASCO Food Drink
 LASCO LaSoy Lactose-free
 LASCO Whole Milk
 LASCO Skimmed Milk
 iCool water, flavoured water and juice drinks
 LASCO MilkySoy

LASCO Distributors, Limited
LASMED
LASCO Food Drink  
Lasoy Lactose Free  
Milky Soy  
Cereals
iCool
 LASCO Mixed vegetables
 BabyYum
 Curves

Lasco Financial Service Limited 
Lasco MoneyGram (money transfer service), agent for MoneyGram

Pharmaceuticals
Lasco Vitamins
Lasmed brand drugs for HIV and Diabetes  
Authorized Representative and Distribution for many pharmaceutical houses around the world

Consumer products
Edibles: team vegetables, corned beef, sauces, juices, breakfast cereals, crackers, pastas 
Cleaning products: detergents, disinfectants
Personal care: deodorants, toothpastes, soaps, baby / and adult diapers

Lasco Barbados 
Distribution of pharmaceuticals, edibles and personal care products
Representative of pharmaceutical houses

References

External links
Lasco Group

Companies of Jamaica.